NewsNet (stylized as NEWSnet) is an American news-oriented free-to-air television network and newscast production company owned by Bridge News, LLC, which itself is owned by Manoj Bhargava's Bridge Media Networks. The network is structured to broadcast a tightly-formatted 30-minute newswheel 24 hours a day, incorporating freshly-updated information that covers various areas of interest (such as national news, sports, entertainment, weather and business). Breaking news stories are updated constantly as they develop and new information becomes available.

In addition to being carried on digital subchannels of affiliated television stations, NewsNet also distributes its programming through a livestream that is available on its website, as well as its mobile app in areas where it does not have a terrestrial TV affiliate. The network also provides an optional turnkey local news production service (Custom Newsroom Solutions) for stations that do not maintain their own local news departments to produce local news capsule segments or full-length newscasts. NewsNet's primary studio facilities (which also houses master control operations of the network's East Coast flagship station WMNN-LD [channel 26] and dual MyNetworkTV/Cozi TV affiliate WXII-LD [channel 12]) are located on West 13th Street and 3rd Avenue in Cadillac, while its secondary studio facilities are located on Haggerty Road in Farmington Hills, Michigan.

Background and history

On September 28, 2017, Eric Wotila – who founded low-power all-news station WMNN-LD in Cadillac, Michigan and oversaw the studio design and construction for News Channel Nebraska, a Norfolk, Nebraska-based quasi-state network of five low-power stations that also maintained an all-news programming format – started a crowdfunding campaign on Kickstarter to fund the launch of a 24-hour national news channel – under the working title, the Local News Network (LNN) – intended for broadcast, online and mobile distribution.

Citing favorable opinions from viewers about the "straight-to-the-facts, no-nonsense and commentary-free" coverage provided by WMNN-LD, the Local News Network proposed to offer a news wheel format (similar in structure to the 1982–2005 format of HLN, and the formats of defunct all-news networks such as All News Channel and Satellite News Channel) that would eschew the often-politically focused panel discussion programs that have populated the afternoon, nighttime and weekend schedules of cable news channels (particularly CNN, MSNBC and Fox News Channel) since the early 2000s. The project called for LNN to be based out of WMNN's Cadillac studio facility, with the hope of eventually opening bureaus elsewhere around the United States. The project failed to reach its funding goal of $100,000 needed to develop LNN – which would have been used to pay for equipment and staffing necessary to handle the national broadcasts – by the closure of the 50-day campaign on November 17, 2017, raising only $8,012 from 78 public backers. Wotila subsequently sought to obtain backing from investors to fund the venture.

On March 15, 2018, Wotila and other partners involved in the LNN project announced the launch of NewsNet, which would maintain the concept originally developed prior to the commencement of the Kickstarter campaign.

NewsNet signed on for the first time on January 1, 2019 at 7:00 p.m. Eastern Time, with Evening Edition serving as the network's inaugural program. On May 8, 2019, ground was broken on new studios. The facility will consist of three studios, each with their own control rooms and a new, state-of-the-art master control room overseeing the operations of NewsNet, WMNN-LD and WXII-LP. The new studio debuted on-air at 4:00 a.m. ET on December 9.

Because of Wotila's involvement with News Channel Nebraska, NewsNet does not compete with NCN and has no affiliates in that state.

On January 13, 2022, NewsNet and the rest of Freelancer Television Broadcasting's portfolio, including WMNN-LD and WXII-LD, were sold to investor Manoj Bhargava, with Eric Wotila retaining 10% ownership in the new company Bridge News, LLC. Under the terms of the deal, Bridge News would operate the stations via a time brokerage agreement with Freelancer Television Broadcasting. The sale was consummated on March 24.

On April 18, 2022, at exactly noon ET, NewsNet debuted a new logo, graphics package and slogan, News... as it used to be. A week later, on April 25, the network hired Phillip Hendrix, former senior producer at the Black News Channel, to serve as its news director, replacing Remington Hernandez (who will remain as the network's primary news anchor). Hendrix was succeeded in July by Peter Ziemelis (a longtime executive producer at ABC affiliate WJRT-TV [channel 12] in Flint).

On May 16, 2022, NewsNet officially debuted a secondary studio facility in Farmington Hills and made several additions to its on-air team, including Detroit local news veterans Jill Washburn (formerly of CBS O&O WWJ-TV [channel 62] and Fox O&O WJBK [channel 2]) and Glenn Ray (formerly of WKBD-TV [channel 50]). Also on the same date, the network implemented major changes to its schedule: Mornings moved to a later timeslot at 6:00 a.m. ET, while the weekday edition of Continuing Coverage reduced its running time from four hours to two (albeit remaining at the 4:00 p.m. ET slot). The weekday broadcasts of Evening Edition, on the other hand, expanded to six hours beginning at 6:00 p.m. ET, and Nightside Edition (which airs at midnight ET) also expanded to six hours with the addition of a two-hour block at 4:00 a.m. ET. The running times of Midday Edition (which airs at noon ET) and the weekend broadcasts of Continuing Coverage and Evening Edition would remain unchanged.

On August 6, 2022, NewsNet debuted Weekend Edition, an all-weekend rolling news block that compiles the biggest headlines of the past week but retaining the network's signature newswheel format (over time, it evolved to a traditional format). The new program replaced the weekend broadcasts of Mornings, Midday Edition, Continuing Coverage, Evening Edition, and Nightside Edition.

In the 4th week of September 2022, Bridge Media Networks announced it would acquire several LPTV stations in Las Vegas (KDNU-LD), South Florida (WDGT-LD, WHMR-LD and WKIZ-LD) and Detroit (WHNE-LD). Upon the completion of the transactions, the company will convert these stations into NewsNet O&Os.

Broadcast feeds
The national NewsNet service currently operates two separate broadcast feeds:

 Domestic – the network's official feed, providing 165 hours of rolling-news coverage each week. The domestic feed also contains U.S.-only content, particularly during commercial breaks. These include locally-targeted advertisements, network promos, and a 90-minute block of educational children's programming on Saturday and Sunday mornings at 10:30 a.m. ET to comply with programming guidelines imposed by the federally-mandated Children's Television Act. NewsNet's domestic feed is available to U.S. viewers, over-the-air, through affiliated local television stations.
 Online – almost identical to the domestic feed, but provides opt-outs during domestic-only content (including a 90-minute extension of the Weekend Edition morning block on Saturdays and Sundays at 10:30 a.m. ET and a two-minute interstitial segment during commercial breaks entitled Top Stories from the Newsroom [subject to preemptions due to online ad inserts]). NewsNet's online feed is available in the U.S. through various over-the-top (OTT) streaming platforms and a downloadable app for Amazon Fire TV, Apple TV and Roku streaming devices, and worldwide on the network's website and iOS/Android apps.

Programming
NewsNet's programming is structured around a rolling news wheel format, providing up-to-date information on the top national and international stories in just 30 minutes.

Each half-hour of the wheel format begins with the "A" block, which features a nearly 12-minute rundown of the latest news headlines (with updated details provided when breaking news develops).

The remainder of each half-hour includes a national weather forecast summary (at 12 and 42 minutes past the hour; branded as Weather Report), the latest sports highlights and scores (at 17 and 47 minutes past the hour; primarily utilizing talent from its sister network, Sports News Highlights), and topical news segments focusing on health, business, entertainment, and other subjects (at 24 and 54 minutes past the hour).

Current programs
Rolling news blocks
 NewsNet Continuing Coverage (December 9, 2019–present)
 NewsNet Evening Edition (January 1, 2019–present)
 NewsNet Midday Edition (January 2, 2019–present)
 NewsNet Mornings (December 9, 2019–present)
 NewsNet Nightside Edition (January 2, 2019–present)
 NewsNet Weekend Edition  (August 6, 2022–present)
E/I programming
 America's Heartland (January 6, 2019–present)
 Animal Rescue (January 5, 2019–present)
 Biz Kid$ (January 6, 2019–present)
 Dog Tales (January 5, 2019–present)
 Missing (January 5, 2019–present)
 Think Big (January 6, 2019–present)

Former programs
 NewsNet Morning Edition (January 2–December 8, 2019)

Affiliates
, NewsNet has current and pending affiliation agreements with 57 television stations in 49 television markets encompassing 25 states, covering 31.75% of the United States. The majority of NewsNet affiliates are low-power stations that are within the geographic boundaries of a particular TV market, but do not cover the entirety of the market.

In addition to allowing affiliates to sell local advertising (offering four minutes of local commercial time per hour to prospective stations), NewsNet provides the option for its broadcast affiliates to pre-empt the national weather segment to allow to carry their own local weather cut-ins (either produced by the network or by affiliate stations themselves), as well as feature segments at the end of each half hour to allow to carry a five-minute-long local headline "capsule", providing news and other timely information focusing on the local viewing area.

Current affiliates
Stations listed in bold are owned-and-operated.

Former affiliates

References

External links

Television networks in the United States
24-hour television news channels in the United States
NewsNet
Television channels and stations established in 2019
2019 establishments in Michigan